Fox Lake is a natural lake in South Dakota, in the United States.

Fox Lake was so named on account of the area being a favorite trapping ground of foxes.

See also
List of lakes in South Dakota

References

Lakes of South Dakota
Lakes of Deuel County, South Dakota